There have been 51 women in the South Australian House of Assembly since its establishment in 1857. Women have had the right to vote and the right to stand as candidates since 1894.

In 1895, South Australian women became the first state in Australia, and some of the first in the world, to be given the right to vote and stand for election to Parliament. The following year at the 1896 election, the first women in Australia voted. Ironically, South Australia was the last state to elect a female representative, at the 1959 election, when Jessie Cooper and Joyce Steele were elected to the Parliament of South Australia for the Liberal and Country League (LCL). Molly Byrne was the first Labor woman in the House at the 1965 election.

Women have been continuously represented in the House since. Steele would also become the first female minister in 1968. Only two women have represented minor parties, these being Heather Southcott for the Democrats in 1982, and Karlene Maywald for the Nationals from 1997 to 2010. Liberal Isobel Redmond in 2009 became the first and only woman to lead a major party in South Australia when she became Leader of the Opposition. Labor's Lyn Breuer from 2010 to 2013 was the first and only female Speaker of the South Australian House of Assembly. South Australia has not had a female Premier or Treasurer.

List of women in the South Australian House of Assembly

Names in bold indicate women who have been appointed as Ministers and Parliamentary Secretaries during their time in Parliament. Names in italics indicate women who were first elected at a by-election. An asterisk (*) indicates that the member also served in the Legislative Council.

Timeline

See also

 
South Australia